The Haval Jolion is a compact crossover SUV produced by Haval of Great Wall Motor since 2020.

Overview

The Haval Jolion was first shown at the 2020 Beijing Auto Show. The Chinese name pronounces "Chulian" and means "first love" in Chinese. The Haval Jolion is based on the Lemon platform which also underpins the Haval Big Dog.

The Jolion for the Brunei market went on sale in August 2021. Imported from China, it is offered in Plus, Pro and Max in three variants with 1.5-litre turbocharged petrol engine with 7-speed dual-clutch transmission as a single powertrain option.

Powertrain
The Jolion also has a 7-speed dual-clutch transmission and front-wheel drive.

Interior
The interior of the Haval Jolion features a 12.3-inch central touchscreen with Apple CarPlay and satellite navigation enabled. Additionally, a 7.0-inch instrument display and head-up display is also equipped. Other features include a six-speaker sound system, synthetic leather upholstery, a six-way electric driver's seat with ventilation, dual-zone climate control, PM2.5 air filter, wireless phone charging, and a choice of four interior colours.

Haval Jolion Hybrid

The Haval Jolion Hybrid was launched in Thailand in November 2021, with three trim levels offered named Tech, Pro, and Ultra. The front end design of the Haval Jolion Hybrid is different from the regular model, with alterations made to the headlights, turn signals, front bumper, front grille and rear bumper.

References

Jolion
Compact sport utility vehicles
Crossover sport utility vehicles
Front-wheel-drive vehicles
Cars of China
2020s cars
Cars introduced in 2020
Hybrid vehicles